Fung Cheung is one of the 31 constituencies in the Yuen Long District of Hong Kong.

The constituency returns one district councillor to the Yuen Long District Council, with an election every four years. The seat was last held by Democratic Alliance Johnny Mak since its creation in 1994.

Fung Cheung constituency is loosely based on southeastern part of Yuen Long Town, covering Fung Yau Street, Fung Kwan Street, Fung Cheung Road including private residential estates such as Greenfields and Grand Del Sol with estimated population of 15,976.

Councillors represented

Election results

2010s

2000s

1990s

Notes

References

Yuen Long Town
Constituencies of Hong Kong
Constituencies of Yuen Long District Council
1994 establishments in Hong Kong
Constituencies established in 1994